Action model learning (sometimes abbreviated action learning) is an area of machine learning concerned with creation and modification of software agent's knowledge about effects and preconditions of the actions that can be executed within its environment. This knowledge is usually represented in logic-based action description language and used as the input for automated planners.

Learning action models is important when goals change. When an agent acted for a while, it can use its accumulated knowledge about actions in the domain to make better decisions. Thus, learning action models differs from reinforcement learning. It enables reasoning about actions instead of expensive trials in the world. Action model learning is a form of inductive reasoning, where new knowledge is generated based on agent's observations. It differs from standard supervised learning in that correct input/output pairs are never presented, nor imprecise action models explicitly corrected.

Usual motivation for action model learning is the fact that manual specification of action models for planners is often a difficult, time consuming, and error-prone task (especially in complex environments).

Action models 

However, many state of the art action learning methods assume determinism and do not induce . In addition to determinism, individual methods differ in how they deal with other attributes of domain (e.g. partial observability or sensoric noise).

Action learning methods

State of the art 
Recent action learning methods take various approaches and employ a wide variety of tools from different areas of artificial intelligence and computational logic. As an example of a method based on propositional logic, we can mention SLAF (Simultaneous Learning and Filtering) algorithm, which uses agent's observations to construct a long propositional formula over time and subsequently interprets it using a satisfiability (SAT) solver. Another technique, in which learning is converted into a satisfiability problem (weighted MAX-SAT in this case) and SAT solvers are used, is implemented in ARMS (Action-Relation Modeling System).
Two mutually similar, fully declarative approaches to action learning were based on logic programming paradigm Answer Set Programming (ASP) and its extension, Reactive ASP. In another example, bottom-up inductive logic programming approach was employed. Several different solutions are not directly logic-based. For example, the action model learning using a perceptron algorithm or the multi level greedy search over the space of
possible action models. In the older paper from 1992, the action model learning was studied as an extension of reinforcement learning.

Literature 
Most action learning research papers are published in journals and conferences focused on artificial intelligence in general (e.g. Journal of Artificial Intelligence Research (JAIR), Artificial Intelligence, Applied Artificial Intelligence (AAI) or AAAI conferences). Despite mutual relevance of the topics, action model learning is usually not addressed on planning conferences like ICAPS.

See also
 Machine learning
 Automated planning and scheduling
 Action language
 PDDL
 Architecture description language
 Inductive reasoning
 Computational logic
 Knowledge representation

References 

Inductive reasoning
Machine learning
Data mining